Avtandili Tchrikishvili (born 18 March 1991) is a Georgian judoka. After Tchrikishvilli won the World Championships in 2014, the Ministry of Sport and Youth Affairs of Georgia named him the Best Georgian Sportsman of 2014.  He is currently ranked No. 1 in the world (as of 6 June 2016).

Olympiad
Avtandili Tchrikishvili competed in the men's 81 kg event at the 2012 Summer Olympics; after defeating Tomislav Marijanović in the second round, he was eliminated by Travis Stevens in the third round because of his trauma.

He competed for Georgia again at the 2016 Summer Olympics. He defeated Iván Felipe Silva of Cuba during the round of 32. He then defeated Juan Diego Turcios of El Salvador in the round of 16. He was defeated by eventual silver medalist, Travis Stevens of the United States in the semifinals. He was defeated by Takanori Nagase of Japan in the bronze medal match. He was the flagbearer for Georgia during the Parade of Nations.

Achievements

References

External links

 
 
 
 
 
 Georgian Judo Federation

1991 births
Living people
People from Gardabani
Male judoka from Georgia (country)
Olympic judoka of Georgia (country)
World judo champions
Judoka at the 2012 Summer Olympics
Judoka at the 2016 Summer Olympics
Judoka at the 2015 European Games
European Games medalists in judo
European Games gold medalists for Georgia (country)
European Games silver medalists for Georgia (country)
21st-century people from Georgia (country)